The Cordilleran ice sheet was a major ice sheet that periodically covered large parts of North America during glacial periods over the last ~2.6 million years.

Extent
The ice extent covered almost all of the continental shelf north of the Strait of Juan de Fuca and south from approximately the southwestern third of the Yukon Territory.  This included all of British Columbia, South Central Alaska, the Alaska Panhandle, and peninsula.  The southern glacial maximums extended south to Washington state Washington around Olympia in the west and to Spokane, the Idaho Panhandle, and much of Western Montana at the eastern glacial edge. At its eastern end the Cordilleran ice sheet merged with the Laurentide Ice Sheet at the Continental Divide, forming an area of ice that contained one and a half times as much water as the Antarctic ice sheet does today. The ice sheet faded north of the Alaska Range because the climate was too dry to form glaciers.

It is probable, though, that its northern margin also migrated south due to the influence of starvation caused by very low levels of precipitation.

Refugia
At its western end it is currently understood that several small glacial refugia existed during the last glacial maximum below present sea level in the now-submerged Hecate Strait and on the Brooks Peninsula in northern Vancouver Island. However, evidence of ice-free refugia above present sea level north of the Olympic Peninsula has been refuted by genetic and geological studies since the middle 1990s.

Thawing
Unlike the Laurentide Ice Sheet, which is believed to have taken as much as eleven thousand years to fully melt, it is believed the Cordilleran ice sheet, except for areas that remain glaciated today, melted very quickly, probably in four thousand years or less. This rapid melting caused such floods as the overflow of Lake Missoula and shaped the topography of the extremely fertile Inland Empire of Eastern Washington.

Sea levels during glaciation

Because of the weight of the ice, the mainland of northwest North America was so depressed that sea levels at the Last Glacial Maximum were over a hundred metres higher than they are today (measured by the level of bedrock).

However, on the western edge at the Haida Gwaii, the lower thickness of the ice sheet meant that sea levels were as much as  lower than they are today, forming a lake in the deepest parts of the strait. This was because the much greater thickness of the center of the ice sheet served to push upwards areas at the edge of the continental shelf in a glacial forebulge. The effect of this during deglaciation was that sea levels on the edge of the ice sheet, which naturally deglaciated first, initially rose due to an increase in the volume of water, but later fell due to rebound after deglaciation. Some underwater features along the Pacific Northwest were exposed because of the lower sea levels, including Bowie Seamount west of Haida Gwaii which has been interpreted as an active volcanic island throughout the last ice age.

These effects are important because they have been used to explain how migrants to North America from Beringia were able to travel southward during the deglaciation process due purely to the exposure of submerged land between the mainland and numerous continental islands. They are also important for understanding the direction evolution has taken since the ice retreated.

See also 
Keewatin ice sheet
Labrador ice sheet
Baffin ice sheet

References

 Hidy, A. J., Gosse, J. C., Froese, D. G., Bond, J. D., and Rood, D. H. (2013). A latest Pliocene age for the earliest and most extensive Cordilleran Ice Sheet in northwestern Canada. Quaternary Science Reviews 61:77-84. 
 Gwaii Haanas National Park Reserve and Haida Heritage Site
 Clarke, T.E., D.B. Levin, D.H. Kavanaugh and T.E. Reimchen. 2001. Rapid Evolution in the Nebria Gregaria Group (Coleoptera: Carabidae) and the Paleogeography of the Queen Charlotte Islands. Evolution 51:1408–1418
 Brown, A. S., and H. Nasmith. 1962. The glaciation of the Queen Charlotte Islands. Canadian Field-Naturalist 76:209–219.
 Byun, S. A., B. F. Koop, and T. E. Reimchen. 1997. North American black bear mtDNA phylogeography: implications for morphology and the Haida Gwaii glacial refugium controversy. Evolution 51:1647–1653.
 Richard B. Waitt, Jr., and Robert M. Thorson, 1983. The Cordilleran Ice Sheet in Washington, Idaho, and Montana. IN: H.E. Wright, Jr., (ed.), 1983, Late-Quaternary Environments of the United States, Volume 1: The Late Pleistocene (Stephen C. Porter (ed.)): University of Minnesota Press, 407p., Chapter 3, p.53-70. Abstract
 Holder, K., Montgomerie, R., and V.L. Friesen. 1999. A test of the glacial refugium hypothesis using patterns of mitochondrial and nuclear DNA sequence variation in the rock ptarmingan (Lagopus mutus). Evolution 53(6):1936–1950. 
 Warner, B.G., Mathewes, R.W., and J.J. Clague. 1982. Ice-free conditions on the Queen Charlotte Islands, British Columbia, at the height of late Wisconsin glaciation. Science 218(4573):675–6770 

Glaciology
Glaciology of Canada
Glaciology of the United States
Ice ages
Ice sheets
Geology of British Columbia
Geology of Montana
Geology of Idaho
Geology of Yukon
Geology of Washington (state)
Geology of Alaska
Geology of Alberta